Perfect Skin may refer to:

"Perfect Skin" (Lloyd Cole and the Commotions song)
"Perfect Skin" (The 69 Eyes song)